The Newton Graphic was a weekly newspaper, published in Massachusetts from 1882 to 1997.

References

External links 
Historic Newspaper on Chronicling America

Newspapers published in Massachusetts
Newton, Massachusetts
Waltham, Massachusetts
1882 establishments in Massachusetts
Publications established in 1882